A Cigar store Indian is an advertisement figure made to represent tobacconists.

Cigar store Indian may also refer to:
 The Cigar Store Indian, Seinfeld TV episode
 Cigar Store Indians, American band